Navy Children School, Kochi (formerly known as Naval Public School from 1986 to 2007) is an educational institution located on Willingdon island in the Naval Base at Kochi, Kerala.

It provides primary, secondary and senior secondary (up to 12th standard) and follows the syllabus set by the Central Board of Secondary Education.

History 
The Navy Children School, Kochi was started in the year 1986 under the Naval Education Society, Naval Headquarters, New Delhi. It is a Co-educational School. The school was officially started on 8 July 1986 under the name Naval Public School.

Notable alumni
 Neha Dhupia
Asin Thottumkal

References

External links 
Official Website
https://www.ncskochicampuscare.in

High schools and secondary schools in Kochi
1986 establishments in Kerala
Educational institutions established in 1986